Bandi Dhundan is one of the 51 union councils of Abbottabad District in Khyber-Pakhtunkhwa province of Pakistan. According to the 2017 Census of Pakistan, the population is 27,764. Dhund Abbassi tribe Dominate this area.

Subdivisions
 Banda Pir Khan
 Bandi Dhundan

References

Union councils of Abbottabad District